Events in the year 1882 in Bolivia.

Incumbents
President: Narciso Campero

Events

Births
January 12 - José Luis Tejada Sorzano, President 1934-1936

Deaths

 
1880s in Bolivia